Kim Se-jin (1965–1986) was a student activist and anti-war peace activist in South Korea who committed suicide by self-immolation.

External links
 The Politics of Military Revolution

Anti-Americanism
1965 births
1987 deaths
South Korean politicians
South Korean politicians who committed suicide